

Ælfgar was a medieval Bishop of Elmham.

Ælfgar was consecrated in 1001 and resigned the see between 1012 and 1016. He died on 24 or 25 December 1021.

References

External links
 

Bishops of Elmham
1021 deaths
Year of birth unknown